The Keg Mansion is a former residential building that is presently used as a location for a The Keg restaurant, in Toronto, Ontario, Canada. The building was initially known as Euclid Hall, a prominent downtown heritage building located at 515 Jarvis Street. 

The building was originally built in 1867 for Arthur McMaster, nephew of Canadian senator and banker, William McMaster. In 1915, the building was bequeathed by the Massey family to Victoria College, a federated college of the University of Toronto. In 1976, The Keg repurposed the building to serve as a restaurant.

History
The house was originally built in 1867 by Arthur McMaster, nephew of the prominent businessman William McMaster. At the time Jarvis Street was one of the wealthiest parts of Toronto and the street was lined by large manors. The house was set back from the street and surrounded by large gardens.

The former house has a neutral colour palette with pops of colour as in the green brass accents over the windows and red shingles on the turret. The hall uses the soft, deep colours to contrast the hard, crisp edges. As a residence, it consisted of twenty six rooms and seventeen fireplaces with a stable and large brick carriage house in the back. With significant alterations to the interior having been made since its era as a dwelling, the interior is now very different from the original.

In 1882, it was purchased by Hart Massey and his wife who had just returned to Toronto from Cleveland. The Masseys renovated the house and added a turret, verandah, and greenhouse, but the original Gothic façade was not significantly altered. Hart Massey's sons bought homes surrounding the manor. To the north his son Chester D. Massey built the home where Hart's grandchildren Vincent and Raymond were raised.

As the area became more urban and various commercial operations moved into the area, the Masseys decided to leave. The building was then bequeathed to the University of Toronto's Victoria College in 1915. The manor served as the first home of Toronto radio station CFRB in the 1920s and was home to an art gallery for several decades until 1960. It later was bought by Jules Fine, and became a restaurant named Julie's Mansion, with the Bombay Bicycle Club existing on the top floor. After suffering a stroke, the grounds were sold off and the greenhouses demolished and replaced with a service station. In 1976, it became home to a The Keg restaurant, and it was renamed the Keg Mansion.

In September 2015, almost two dozen animal rights activists and vegans gathered at the Keg Mansion to protest animal cruelty.

See also 
List of oldest buildings and structures in Toronto

References 

Houses in Toronto
Restaurants in Toronto
Gothic Revival architecture in Toronto
City of Toronto Heritage Properties